Kharkhari (or Kharkharee in older spelling) may refer to:

Bangladesh 
 Kharkhari, Rajshahi, Rajshahi Division

India 
 Kharkhari, Birni block, Giridih district, Jharkhand
 Kharkhari, Dhanbad, Dhanbad district, Jharkhand
 Kharkhari, Loharu block (tehsil) and Bhiwani district, Haryana

Kharkhari, Tisri block, Giridih district, Jharkhand

Pakistan 
 Lake Kharkhari

See also
 Kharkhari Nahar, Delhi, India